José Manuel López Balaguer (22 August 1925, in Santiago de los Caballeros – 29 January 2015, in Santo Domingo) also known as Lope Balaguer, was a Dominican singer; he was nephew of Dominican president Joaquín Balaguer and cousin of the musicians Johnny Pacheco and Nelo López. He married Flor de Oro Trujillo, daughter of dictator Rafael Trujillo.

Biography
Lope Balaguer debuted in 1940 as a singer in the radio. In 1944 in Bonao he did his first presentation in the radio station The Voice of the Yuna, with the San José orchestra, with which in the following year under the direction of the composer and Cuban pianist Julio Gutiérrez debuted in the Coffee Ariete in Santo Domingo. HILL Magazine chose him as the best singer of the country and gave him the nickname of The tenor of the youth. In the same year he travelled to Cuba, where he acted in nocturnal clubs of Havana and the radio, and is where he took the artistic name of Lope Balaguer.

In Puerto Rico he enjoyed of the success of The Escambrón, and in 1946 the magazine Living room Fígaro chose him as best singer of the year alongside Manuel Hernández in Santo Domingo. In 1947 it was conceded to him an agreement with the radio station The Voice of the Yuna (from 1949, The Dominican Voice). He had done tours to Puerto Rico, Venezuela, Colombia, Guatemala, El Salvador, Panama, Haiti, Guadeloupe, Martinique and United States.

In 1946, Lope Balaguer recorded his first disks with Luis Benjamín in Puerto Rico. With the orchestra of Antonio Morel, records a disk with Dominican songs. His more sounded successes were Never Have said you of Pope Molina, Neither Neither Steps by Luis Kalaff, Sands of the desert of Héctor Cabral and Rafael Columbus, Follow me of Manuel Troncoso, Then married me by tí of Rafael Solano, An unforgettable day by Pedro Vilar and Of meat or iron of Fernando Arias. In general, he recorded 28 disks of vinyl, 5 CDs and recently several CDs of audio.

Ancestors 

Source Instituto Dominicano de Genealogía (Cápsulas genealógicas)

Discography 
 Confession of Love (with Pope Molina) (1950)
 Confession of Love
 Like this it is the Life
 Footprints of Pain
 Easy to Remember
 Súplica
 By All the Ways
 Injure me Again
 Crooked child
 It laughs
 Now That Are Alone
 Call me
 The Torrent
 Headcount (with the Orchestra of Ángel Bussi) (1950)
 Headcount
 And Anybody More than Me
 The Goblin
 Liar With me
 It is Curious
 Preciosidad
 Goodbye Mine life
 In An Odd World
 The Kiss That Gave Me
 Mannequin
 Days of School
 Yours
 Lope Balaguer and the Saint Orchestra José (with Pope Molina) (1960)
 Apparition
 The Mortgage
 Corazonada
 You know Why
 Papers
 Always You
 I Am That
 In the Darkness
 Each Day More and more
 It was Your Fault
 If Some Time
 I Need you
 Serrana (With the Orchestra of Ángel Bussi) (1960)
 Serrana
 It wanted to Be
 It returns to My
 Paradise Dreamed
 Dry leaf
 Yours
 Selfishness
 To the Return
 They see
 Distrust
 My Adoration
 Missed Meeting
 There will be A New World By Love (1968)
 Lope Balaguer of Today and of Always (1969)
 Why you Cry?
 It has to Be
 It is Well
 As it Treats A Woman
 It takes My Love
 Sea of Sleeplessness
 You Do not abandon Me
 I am to Your Order
 My Glory
 That Romance
 Album of Gold (1975)
Disk 1
 Peregrina Without Love
 The Reason
 My Glory
 There is A lot That Forget
 You Do not abandon Me
 Follow me
 By Love
 Selfishness
 Sands of the Desert
 Crooked child
Disk 2
 I crossed the Border
 Never I Have Said it to You
 Flor of Naranjo
 In the Darkness
 They see
 Paradise Dreamed
 Have Jealousies
 Serrana
 To the Return
 When Me Besas
 I Seat me Well With you (1976)
 I Seat me Well With you
 An Unforgettable Day
 Of Which Voucher That Want You
 The Reason
 I crossed the Border
 When it Go back the Snow
 As it Treats to A Woman
 So Alone A Poor Corazón
 Adultery
 No Me Arrepiento of the Affection That Gave You
 Those Years Forty... (1977)
 That Is missing You Do Me
 Free soul
 Embrace me Like this
 Yours lies
 Black night
 Last night I Spoke With the Moon
 Thank you
 Reality
 No longer I Go back to Want
 I Do not have to Go back
 The Night, the Moon and I
 You Do not go You
 Spectacular (1977)
 It wanted to With you
 Absence
 A Woman
 Something Goes
 When it Rains
 I offer By You
 Amnesia
 The Love Is One
 Ojalá
 I Do not have Corazón
 Album of Gold (1980)
Disk 1
 When it Go back the Snow
 By Love
 Have Jealousies
 So Alone A Poor Corazón
 Crooked child
 As it Treats A Woman
 Sands of the Desert
 Paradise Dreamed
 They see
 Selfishness
Disk 2
 To the Return
 Flor of Naranjo
 Serrana
 You Do not go You
 I Do not go back to Want
 I Seat me Well With you
 The Night, the Moon and I
 Last night I Spoke With the Moon
 Embrace me Like this
 Of Which Voucher That Want You
 My Life Is A Song (1988)
 My Life Is A Song
 Confession / The Casita
 It finish
 Small Mine
 Without You
 Different Love
 Of Which Way Want Me
 What will be of My
 When you Arrived You
 Potpourri in Do Lower
 Old Letter
 Ternezas
 You Do not go You More
 The Nightingale Bohemio
 It is With You
 Album of Gold (1990)
 To the Return
 Flor of Naranjo
 They see
 Serrana
 Paradise Dreamed
 Selfishness
 Sands of the Desert
 Crooked child
 As it Treats to A Woman
 So Alone A Poor Corazón
 By Love
 Have Jealousies
 When it Go back the Snow

References

External links 
 The Train of Yaguaramas – Lope Balaguer
 Fundacion Jose Guillermo Carrillo – Lope Balaguer

1925 births
2015 deaths
20th-century Dominican Republic male singers
Dominican Republic people of Catalan descent
Dominican Republic people of French descent
People from Santiago Province (Dominican Republic)